Coppini is a surname. Notable people with the surname include:

Aquilino Coppini (died 1629), Italian musician and lyricist
Enzo Coppini (1920–2011), Italian racing cyclist
Fausto Eliseo Coppini (1870–1945), Italian-Argentine painter
Francesco Coppini, Bishop of Terni from 1458 to 1462
Germán Coppini (1961–2013), Spanish singer-songwriter
Matteo Coppini (born 1989), Sammarinese footballer
Pompeo Coppini (1870–1957), Italian-American sculptor